Hagău may refer to several villages in Romania:

 Hagău, a village in Cătina Commune, Cluj County
 Hagău, a village in Râciu Commune, Mureș County